Gondelsheim may refer to the following places in Germany:

 Gondelsheim, village in the borough of Karlsruhe, Baden-Württemberg
 Gondelsheim (Weinsheim), village in the municipality of Weinsheim, county of Bitburg-Prüm, Rhineland-Palatinate